Test Stand VII (P-7) was the principal  V-2 rocket testing facility at Peenemünde Airfield and was capable of static firing of rocket motors up to 200 tons thrust.  Notable events at the site include the first successful V-2 launch on 3 October 1942, visits by German military leaders, and Allied reconnaissance overflights and bombing.

Description
Two distinguishing features of P-7 were the 670-yard-long elliptical high-sloped sand wall and the wide concrete-lined trench (flame pit) with a large symmetrical water-cooled flame deflector of molybdenum-steel pipes. Beside the flame pit was a long underground room where  diameter delivery pipes were housed to route cooling water at 120 gallon per second from three huge pumps in the pumphouse to the flame deflector in the pit.

While the elliptical sand wall was for blocking high sea winds and blown sand, concrete structures were integrated into the wall and under the ground to protect equipment and personnel from rocket explosions and enemy bombing (a sand-filled dummy warhead, called "the elephant", was normally used). A large gap in the wall allowed easy entry by vehicles (particularly railcars with propellants), and an open tunnel through the ellipse wall at the narrower southern end also allowed entry. Integrated into the ellipse wall next to the tunnel was a massive observation and measuring blockhouse containing the control center. The control center had a double door with a bulletproof glass window from which an observer maintained telephone communication with the Telemetering Building at a remote location from P-7. A receiver in a lighthouse near Koserow provided telemetry from rockets with the Wolman System for Doppler tracking.

Control room
The control room also had switchboards, a row of four periscopes, manometers, frequency gauges, voltmeters and ammeters, green/red/white signal lamps, and switches at the propulsion console and guidance panel to dynamically display approximately 15 measurement points within the rocket. Additionally, the control room had a big "X-time" countdown clock that displayed the time until launch, which was announced via loudspeakers as "X minus four minutes", etc. In addition to the control room, the blockhouse also contained offices, a conference room, a small dormitory with double bunks and an adjoining shower, a wash room, and a workshop. A long underground corridor led from the measurement blockhouse to a room in the concrete foundation by the flame pit, and multiple rows of measurement cables covered the walls of the tunnel. A different gradually rising tunnel led from the long flame pit room to the exterior of the arena near the pumphouse.

Test tower
The prominent tower within the arena was a mobile test frame/crane (Fahrbare Kranbühne) which could be moved over the flame pit to position the rocket nozzle 25 feet above the deflector, and which allowed an entire missile to be gimbaled in two directions up to five degrees from vertical.  The tower included an elevator and a German-made Toledo scale for thrust measurements.  Actual launches were from a steel table-like structure (firing stand, Brennstand) across the railway from the flame pit on the test stand's large concrete foundation.  Under the concrete foundation were the recorder room, a small shop, an office, compressed nitrogen storage cylinders, and catch tanks.  The arena also included an engine cold-calibration pad for conducting flow test measurements by pumping water (instead of Liquid oxygen) and alcohol (which was recovered afterward) via the turbopump through the combustion chamber.  Since the V-2 motor had no controller for the turbopump, cold-calibration allowed the determination of "freak cases" of equipment.

Hangar

Outside of the arena was the 150x185x100h foot assembly and preparation hall/hangar, which had been designed to be able to handle a larger A9/A10 multi-stage rocket that was planned, but never built.  The roof of the hangar had camera stations for filming events.

Allied reconnaissance and bombing
On 15 May 1942 after photographing German destroyers berthed at the port of Kiel, Spitfire pilot Flight Lieutenant D. W. Stevenson photographed 'heavy construction work' near the Peenemünde aerodrome. Later in the month Constance Babington Smith decided the scale was too small ... then something unusual caught my eye ... some extraordinary circular embankments ... I then dismissed the whole thing from my mind. Then a year later on 22 April 1943, Bill White and Ron Prescott in RAF de Havilland Mosquito DZ473 were sent from Leuchars to photograph damage from Allied bombing at the Stettin railyards: "On leaving Stettin, we left our cameras running all down the north coast of Germany, and when the film was developed, it was found to contain pictures of Peenemünde."

On 22 April 1943 a large cloud of steam was photographed near the embankments, which was later identified as coming from a rocket  engine being test fired. Duncan Sandys' first photographic reconnaissance report on Peenemünde was circulated on 29 April 1943, which identified that the lack of power-station activity (Germany had installed electrostatic dust and smoke removers on the power station near Kölpin) indicates that "The circular and elliptical constructions are probably for the testing of explosives and projectiles.  ... In view of the above, it is clear that a heavy long-range rocket is not an immediate threat."  Then on 14 May, an "unusually high level of activity" was visible at "the Ellipse" on photos from two sorties on 14 May, which was the date the Reich Director of Manpower (Gauleiter Fritz Sauckel) was a distinguished visitor at a launch.
The first solid evidence of the existence of a rocket came with a sortie (N/853) on 12 June, when a Spitfire flown by Sqn Ldr Gordon Hughes photographed Peenemünde: one photograph included an object on a railway truck.  Reginald Victor Jones identified the object on 18 June as "a whiteish [sic] cylinder about 35 feet long and 5 or so feet in diameter with a blueish nose and fins at the other end...I had found the rocket."
After Operation Hydra bombed other areas of Peenemünde in 1943, the P-7 blockhouse roof was reinforced, and in a 1944 raid, the blockhouse occupants suffered one injury when a periscope fell.  (Hermann Weidner's Test Stand 8 was lost in the 1944 July and August raids).

The last V-2 launch at Peenemünde was in February 1945, and on 5 May 1945, the 2nd Belorussian Front under General Konstantin Rokossovsky captured the port of Swinemünde and the Usedom island.  Russian infantry under Major Anatole Vavilov stormed Peenemünde and found it "75 per cent wreckage" (the research buildings and test stands had been demolished.)  A former adjutant at Peenemünde, Oberstleutnant Richard Rumschöttel, and his wife were killed during the attack, and Vavilov had orders to destroy the facility.

References

External links

Peenemünde Army Research Center and Airfield
German V-2 rocket facilities
Rocket launch sites in Germany
V-weapon subterranea
World War II sites in Germany
World War II sites of Nazi Germany
Military installations established in 1938
Buildings and structures demolished in 1961
Demolished buildings and structures in Germany
Ruins in Germany
1938 establishments in Germany
1961 disestablishments in Germany
V-2 missile launch sites